The episodes from the anime television series  are based on the Gin Tama manga by Hideaki Sorachi. The series premiered in TV Tokyo on January 8, 2017. It is a sequel to the Gintama° anime series which aired in 2015 and ended in 2016. The studio making the new season is BN Pictures, a new subsidiary of Bandai Namco Entertainment. Chizuru Miyawaki is directing the new season with previous season's director Yoichi Fujita supervising. The series continues the story of eccentric samurai, Gintoki Sakata, his apprentice, Shinpachi Shimura, and a teenage alien girl named Kagura and their work as freelancers, who do odd jobs in order to pay the rent, which usually goes unpaid anyway. Crunchyroll later added the anime series for its streaming service.

Three pieces of theme music are used: one opening theme and two ending themes.The first opening theme is "Kagerou" by ЯeaL and the first ending theme is "SILVER", performed by RIZE. and the second ending theme is "We Gotta Fight" by XY.

In the end of the episode 327, it was announced that the episode would have an announcement in March 26, 2017. It was confirmed that it would began airing the rerun episodes under the name "Yorinuke Gintama.-san), starting on April 2, 2017.



Episode list

References

.